The South Carolina Palmetto Sharpshooters were a sharpshooter unit in the American Civil War. The regiment served with the Army of Northern Virginia from 1862 to 1865. The unit would fight in most of the major battles in the eastern theater, and hard fighting in the western theater with James Longstreet in 1863.

1862 

The regiment would be formed from several South Carolina regiments near Richmond in early 1862. The regiment would be commanded by Micah Jenkins, and assigned to Andersons Brigade, Longstreet's Division, Magruder's Command. The regiments first action would be at the battle of Williamsburg in May 1862, the regiment would hold Fort Magruder against repeated Federal attacks, losing 29 men and withdrawing under the cover of night. The unit would once again see heavy action at the battle of Seven Pines, May 31-June 1.  The sharpshooters would assist in taking Casey's Redoubt, suffering heavy casualties. After taking the redoubt, the unit, assisted by several other regiments would clear the fields behind the redoubt. The sharpshooters would suffer heavily, losing 244 men and ten of the twelve color guards shot down.  At the battle of Gaines Mill the Sharpshooters would charge union positions held by the 16th Michigan and the 82nd Pennsylvania capturing the 16th Michigan's colors, colonel, and a number of men, but at the cost of 96 brave souls. The actions at the battle of Glendale would be the next bloody test for the Palmetto Sharpshooters. The South Carolinians, along with the rest of the brigade, would charge across open fields towards Federal lines while taking heavy fire from the Pennsylvania Reserves and Union batteries. The unit would charge the batteries while taking devastating canister fire and flanking fire from the northern troops, which prompts the whole brigade to retreat back across the fields. But not without capturing several guns and driving the Union troops back. The Palmetto's would lose 255 men out of 375 on the field. The brigade would participate in the second Bull Run campaign and the Maryland campaign, repulsing Burnsides attack south of Sharpsburg at the Battle of Antietam with heavy enlisted and officer loss. these actions produced a combined casualty list of 130. The regiment would not see any major actions during the battle of Fredericksburg.

1863 
The Palmetto Sharpshooters went into the year 1863 a battered band of rebels, with Joseph Walker in command of the regiment. On March 17 the regiment would be attacked by the 11th Pennsylvania Cavalry and a batterie, the Sharpshooters would lose several men wounded and captured. The regiment would miss the battle of Gettysburg and the battle of Chickamauga. During the battle of Wauhatchie, the brigade would cross lookout creek, and drive back Federal skirmishers, with the Palmetto Sharpshooters on the left of the brigade. The brigade would commence a fierce attack against the 149th New York, capturing several Yankees, and taking their supply wagons. The attack was called off once the Confederates became aware of the threat of a counterattack against their rear. The Palmetto Sharpshooters would act as a rear guard for the division. 44 men would not return to their tents that night, including Major F.W. Kilpatrick, who was killed in the days fighting.  As the months passed by, the regiment would be engaged in a number of small engagements and skirmishes, including hard fighting at the Battle of Cambells Station. December would see the regiment in winter quarters, starving, and with their numbers greatly depleted after a long year of campaigning.

1864 
During the Battle of the Wilderness Jenkins brigade would be held in reserve during the actions against Hancock's Second Corp. Longstreet would launch a counterattack which Jenkins brigade is supposed to lead. However, the brigade would receive heavy friendly fire from Mahone's Virginia brigade, wounding General Longstreet and killing Jenkins. The attack would be tried again during the late afternoon, Jenkins’ Brigade, now under Colonel John Bratton of the 6th South Carolina Infantry, lead the attack against the log fortifications lining the Brock Road. The attack would be repulsed, but a ferocious bush fire would force the defenders back. Bratton's brigade took advantage of the breach and charged Union lines. However,  Union artillery concentrated fire on the brigade, driving them back. The next few weeks would see heavy fighting for the Palmetto's during the battles at Spotsylvania Courthouse, North Anna, Totopotomy, and Cold Harbor.

Casualties for the Palmetto's during the Overland Campaign numbered (Note: Casualty figures may be off, as Confederate reports are really scarce, and sometimes not written.):
Wilderness: 8 killed, 65 wounded, Spotsylvania Courthouse: 3 killed, 31 wounded
North Anna: 1 killed, 3 wounded, Totopotomy: 2 killed, 3 wounded
Cold Harbor: 3 killed, 8 wounded, 3 missing

The next major action for the Palmetto Sharpshooters would be at the battle of Darbytown Road, the brigade would assault Federal positions suffering heavily in the process. Brigadier General Bratton would be killed during this action. On December 25 the regiment went into winter quarters, having lost 125 men since August. 1864 was a rough year for the sharpshooters, losing two brigade commanders and a number of officers.

1865 

The Palmetto Sharpshooters would miss the actions during the breakthrough at Petersburg, and would frankly not see any more major actions for the rest of the war. The South Carolina Palmetto Sharpshooters surrendered at Appomattox Court House with the rest of the army on April 9, 1865. The regiment was the largest one in the army at the time of the surrender, numbering 29 officers and 356 men, commanded by Colonel Joseph Walker. Ironically, the South Carolinians shared rations and shook hands with the 16th Michigan, whose colors they had captured at Gaines Mill, two years ago. The regiment would stick together on its march to South Carolina, and would disband once they reached said state. The total casualty figures for the Palmetto Sharpshooters are unknown.

Further reading 

 Baldwin, James J. The Struck Eagle: A Biography of Brigadier General Micah Jenkins, and a History of the Fifth South Carolina Volunteers and the Palmetto Sharpshooters. Burd Street Press, 1996. 
 Rigdon, John C. Historical Sketch And Roster Of The South Carolina Palmetto Sharpshooters (South Carolina Regimental History Series). Independently published. 2019.

See also
List of South Carolina Confederate Civil War units

References 

1862 establishments in the Confederate States of America
1865 disestablishments in the Confederate States of America
Units and formations of the Confederate States Army from South Carolina
Military units and formations established in 1862
Military units and formations disestablished in 1865